Toquepala may refer to:

 Toquepala Caves in Peru
 Toquepala mine in Peru